The Mansion at Burj Khalifa is an approved residential tower which will be built in Downtown Burj Dubai, in Dubai, United Arab Emirates. The tower will rise 227 metres and will have 60 floors and will contain residential apartments. The tower is structured to be constructed in concrete and will serve as a residential building. The architects involved in designing the tower are Adrian Smith and will be developed by Emaar Properties.

See also
Downtown Burj Khalifa
List of tallest buildings in Dubai
Opera Grand

References

External links
Emporis.com
Ameinfo.com
Estatesdubai.com
Factsheet

Buildings and structures under construction in Dubai
Residential skyscrapers in Dubai